The 2019 Sudamérica Rugby Women's Sevens (Asunción) was the 16th edition of the Sudamérica Women's Sevens and was held in Paraguay from 27 to 28 April. The tournament was a warm-up ahead of the 2019 Sudamérica Women's Olympic qualifying tournament in Peru for the Tokyo Olympics. Although the tournament was not a continental championship it still had some prestige. Brazil were crowned champions and Argentina were runners-up.

Teams

Pool stage

Pool A

Pool B

Pool C

Finals

Challenge pool

Gold pool

3rd Place Playoff

Gold Final

Final standings

References 

2019 in women's rugby union
2019 rugby sevens competitions
Rugby sevens competitions in South America
2019 in South American rugby union
April 2019 sports events in South America